Malik Zahoor Ahmad is a former Pakistani diplomat and Middle East expert. He is currently the Chief Coordinator of the Pakistan Trilateral Secretariat (Afghanistan, Pakistan and the U.S.) and the Director General of NAPHIS. His foreign service career has included two posts in the United States, most recently as Minister of Information and Spokesman at the Embassy of Pakistan in Washington D.C. (1997–1999).

He has made a study of the worldwide rise of Islamic fundamentalism and the phenomenon of terrorism. He has been quoted in mainstream U.S. media including CNN, FoxNews and The Newshour with Jim Lehrer.

Malik Zahoor Ahmad earned a master's degree in mass communications from the University of Leicester, UK and also a B.A. in economics and sociology from Government College, Lahore.

He currently maintains a US residence in McLean, Virginia with his wife and two sons.

References

Pakistani diplomats
Alumni of the University of Leicester
Living people
Year of birth missing (living people)
Government College University, Lahore alumni